Ein Gedi, also spelled En Gedi, meaning "spring of the kid", is an oasis, an archeological site and a nature reserve in Israel, located west of the Dead Sea, near Masada and the Qumran Caves. Ein Gedi, a kibbutz, was established nearby in 1954.

Ein Gedi is a popular tourist attraction, and was listed in 2016 as one of the most popular nature sites in Israel. The site attracts about one million visitors a year.

Etymology
The name Ein Gedi is composed of two words (In both Arabic and Hebrew): ein means spring or a fountain and gǝdi means goat-kid. Ein Gedi thus means "kid spring" or "fountain of the kid".

History and archaeology

Neolithic
At Mikveh Cave archaeologists found Pre-Pottery Neolithic A (PPNA) flint tools and an arrowhead.

Chalcolithic
A Chalcolithic temple (ca. mid-fourth millennium BCE) belonging to the Ghassulian culture was excavated on the slope between two springs, Ein Shulamit and Ein Gedi. More Chalcolithic finds were made at the Moringa and Mikveh Caves.

Bronze Age
No traces of Bronze Age settlement have been found at Ein Gedi.

Iron Age
The remains of the Iron Age settlement at Ein Gedi are located at a tell on the north bank of Wadi Arugot, known in Arabic as Tell el-Jurn (grid position 187/097 PAL) and in Hebrew as Tel Goren. The first permanent Iron Age settlement was Judean and was established around 630 BCE. The site was destroyed or abandoned after the Babylonian destruction of Jerusalem in 587/86 BCE.

Hebrew Bible
Fishing nets will be spread from En-gedi to En-eglaim.

Fleeing from King Saul, David hides in the strongholds at Ein Gedi ( and ) and Saul seeks him "even upon the most craggy rocks, which are accessible only to wild goats". Psalm 63, subtitled a Psalm of David when he was in the wilderness of Judah, has been associated with David's sojourn in the desert of En-gedi.

In  Ein Gedi is identified with Hazazon-tamar, Hazezon Tamar, Hatzatzon-Tamar  or Hazezontamar (חַצְצוֹן תָּמָר ḥaṣṣōn tāmār, "portion [of land] of date palms"), on account of the palm groves which surrounded it, where the Moabites and Ammonites gathered in order to fight Josaphat, king of Judah. In  Hazazon-tamar is mentioned as being an Amorite city, smitten by Chedorlaomer in his war against the cities of the plain.

The Song of Songs speaks of the "vineyards of Ein Gedi". The words of Ecclesiasticus 24:18, "I was exalted like a palm tree in Cades" (’en aígialoîs), may perhaps be understood as the palm trees of Ein Gedi.

Persian period
The settlement at Tel Goren is a rare example of a town which reached its zenith during the Persian period, probably during the late 5th century BCE.

Hellenistic and Hasmonean periods
Ein Gedi receives a fortress and becomes a royal Hasmonean estate.

Early Roman period
According to Jewish-Roman historian Josephus, Ein Gedi served as the capital of a toparchy, and there were excellent palm trees and balsam growing there. The date palm's fruit and the balsam plant's fragrance were essential to the village's economy. The balsam plant also served as a source for expensive medications.

During the First Jewish-Roman War, the Sicarii, who fought the Romans until their defeat and mass suicide at Masada, plundered local villages including Ein Gedi. At Ein Gedi, they drove out the defenders, and killed over seven hundred women and children who could not run away. Pliny claims that Ein Gedi was destroyed during the war, although the Babatha archive shows that Jews lived there once again during the reign of Hadrian and probably earlier. The Babatha archive mentions Ein Gedi as a crown property; the Cohors I Milliaria Thracum is attested there, indicating the presence of Roman soldiers there at the time. The Babatha archive also refers to Ein Gedi as "a village in the territory of Jericho in Judaea". This evidence led researchers to believe that Ein Gedi was no longer a toparchy in its own right following the First Jewish-Roman War and had instead become a village inside the toparchy of Jericho.

Late Roman and Byzantine periods

Ein Gedi survived the catastrophic results of the Bar Kokhba revolt and continued to exist until the sixth or seventh centuries. Eusebius described Ein Gedi as "a large Jewish village" in his early fourth-century Onomasticon. In the early third century CE, a synagogue was built in the center of the village. its remains include a Judeo-Aramaic inscription mosaic now on display at Jerusalem's National Archaeology Campus warning inhabitants against "revealing the town's secret" – possibly the methods for extraction and preparation of the much-prized balsam resin, though not stated outright in the inscription – to the outside world.

Ein Gedi was destroyed in a fire during the late Byzantine period. According to the archeologists who excavated the synagogue, the village was destroyed during the early 6th century by Byzantine emperor Justinian as part of his persecution campaign against Jews in his empire. Others claim that the village was destroyed in a Bedouin raid that occurred before the Persian invasion, probably around the late 6th or early 7th century.

After Ein Gedi was destroyed, the cultivation of balsam around the Dead Sea ceased, and it is believed that its Jewish residents, who were now refugees, took the knowledge of cultivating the balsam with them, causing this knowledge to be lost forever.

Ottoman period
In 1838, Edward Robinson reported that  the whole area were covered with gardens, mainly cucumbers, all belonging  to the Rashaideh tribe.

In April 1848, Lieutenant William Francis Lynch led an American expedition down the Jordan River into the Dead Sea, that stopped at Ein Gedi (Ain Jidy).

Israel
In 1998–99, the archaeological expedition of Yizhar Hirschfeld at Ein Gedi systematically excavated what has been called "the Essenes site", first discovered by Yohanan Aharoni in 1956.

Nature reserve and national park

Ein Gedi nature reserve was declared in 1971 and is one of the most important reserves in Israel. The park is situated on the eastern border of the Judean Desert, on the Dead Sea coast, and covers an area of 14000 dunams ( or ).

The elevation of the land ranges from the level of the Dead Sea at 423 meters (1,388 ft) below sea level to the plateau of the Judean Desert at 200 meters above sea level. Ein Gedi nature reserve includes two spring-fed streams with flowing water year-round: Nahal David and Nahal Arugot (German article at: :de:Nachal Arugot). Two other springs, the Shulamit and Ein Gedi springs, also flow in the reserve. Together, the springs generate approximately three million cubic meters of water per year. Much of the water is used for agriculture or is bottled for consumption.

The reserve is a sanctuary for many types of plant, bird and animal species. The vegetation includes plants and trees from the tropical, desert, Mediterranean, and steppian regions, such as Sodom apple, acacia, jujube, and poplar. The many species of resident birds are supplemented by over 200 additional species during the migration periods in the spring and fall. Mammal species include the Nubian ibex and the rock hyrax.

The Ein Gedi national park features several archaeological sites including the Chalcolithic Temple of Ein Gedi and a first-century CE village. The park was declared in 2002 and covers an area of 8 dunams ( or ).

Sinkholes
Ein Gedi has been subject to a large number of sinkholes appearing in the area, which have even damaged the highway built in 2010 which was supposedly built to a "sinkhole-proof" design. The sinkholes are due to the decline in the water level of the Dead Sea,  at an annual rate of more than a metre, which is attributed to the battle for scarce water resources in the very arid region. The sinkholes form as a result of the receding shoreline (with the surface of the Sea having shrunk by about 33 per cent since the 1960s), where a thick layer of underground salt is left behind. When fresh water arrives in the form of heavy rains, it dissolves the salt as it sinks into the ground, forming an underground cavity, which eventually collapses under the weight of the surface ground layer.

Tourism has been affected by the receding shoreline and the sinkholes, and the amount of water from the rains reaching the sea has diminished since flash floods started pouring into the sinkholes. Huge cave systems called karsts convey water underground between the sinkholes. Scientists in the floodplain area south of Ein Gedi have been using cameras, water testing, videos using drones and satellite monitoring to map the area for safety.

Kibbutz

Kibbutz Ein Gedi, founded in 1956, is a kibbutz located about a kilometer from the oasis.  It offers various tourist attractions and takes advantage of the local weather patterns and the abundance of natural water to cultivate out-of-season produce.  The kibbutz area contains an internationally acclaimed botanical garden covering an area of 100 dunams (10 ha, 24.7 acres). There one can find more than 900 species of plants from all over the world. The kibbutz is also home to the Ein Gedi Eco Park, which functions as both a zoo and an environmental education center, demonstrating sustainable technologies such as solar cookers, greywater systems, mud buildings, and compost toilets.

Shalom Marathon – Dead Sea Half Marathon

The Ein Gedi race, also known as the Shalom Marathon – Dead Sea Half Marathon is a popular road running event over several distances that has been held by the Tamar Regional Council since 1983.

See also
 Archaeology of Israel
 Tourism in Israel
 Wildlife of Israel
 Hiking in Israel
 En-Gedi Scroll

References

Bibliography

 (pp. 384-386)
 
 
 (Robinson and Smith, 1841, vol 3, Appendix 2, p.  116)

 (pp. 143-150)

External links

 Virtual Tour of Ein Gedi - View from the Ein Gedi Promenade
 Ein Gedi in the Dead Sea Map - Bird's-eye view in Flash
 The Israel Nature and Parks Authority - Site page
 Ein Gedi Travel Guide
 Pictures of Ein Gedi synagogue
 Ein Gedi mill, 1893
Survey of Western Palestine, Map 22:  IAA, Wikimedia commons
Photos of Ein Gedi synagogue at the Manar al-Athar photo archive

Nature reserves in Israel
National parks of Israel
Oases of Israel
Springs of Israel
Sites of Special Scientific Interest notified in 1972
Botanical gardens in Israel
Protected areas of Southern District (Israel)
Tells (archaeology)
Canaanite cities
Ancient Jewish settlements of Judaea
Hebrew Bible places
Israeli mosaics
Dead Sea basin
Judaean Desert
Pre-Pottery Neolithic A
Ghassulian